Dawu Township is a rural township in Taitung County, Taiwan.

The majority inhabitants of the township are the indigenous Paiwan people.

Administrative divisions

The township comprises five villages: Dajhu, Daniao, Dawu, Nanhsing and Shangwu.

Climate
Dawu has a tropical monsoon climate. The township is known for its extreme heat due to Foehn wind effects during the daytime especially during the summer months.

Tourist attractions

 Aboriginal Specialization Area
 Dajhu Recreation Area
 Daniao Recreation Area
 Daniao Seaside Original Forest
 Daniao Village Rukou Park
 Dawu Beach Park
 Dawu Fishing Harbor
 Dawu Recreation Coast Fish Market
 Duoliang Station
 Ji-asiou Recreation Area
 Jinlonghu Scenic Area
 Shanjhuku Recreation Farm
 Wangyou Pavilion
 Yuanshan Recreation Area

Transportation

Dawu Township is accessible from Dawu Station and Guzhuang Station of Taiwan Railways.

References

External links

 Dawu Township Office, Taitung County 

Townships in Taitung County